Nõmme Kalju FC U21, commonly known as Nõmme Kalju U21, or simply as Kalju U21, is a football club, based in Nõmme, Tallinn, Estonia.

Founded as Nõmme Kalju II, it is the reserve team of Nõmme Kalju, and currently plays in the Esiliiga B.

Reserve teams in Estonia play in the same league system as the senior team, rather than in a reserve team league. They must play at least one level below their main side, however, they can play in the Estonian Cup.

Honours

Domestic

 Esiliiga B
 Winners (1): 2013

Players

Current squad
 As of 1 March 2017.

Players out on loan

Personnel

Current technical staff

Managerial history

References

External links
Official website
Team at Estonian Football Association

Nomme Kalju U21
Football clubs in Tallinn
2003 establishments in Estonia